The Victor Emanuel Range is a limestone mountain range in the New Guinea Highlands of western Papua New Guinea. It was named after the King of Italy by the Italian naturalist Luigi D'Albertis while he was charting the course of the Fly River, which originates at this range. To the north, the headwaters of the Sepik River are also found here.

References

Mountain ranges of Papua New Guinea